Helicoverpa toddi is a species of moth of the family Noctuidae first described by David F. Hardwick in 1965. It is found in central and southern Africa, including South Africa and Madagascar.

Further reading

toddi
Moths of Africa
Moths described in 1965